Admiral Sir Richard Pilkington Clayton  (9 July 1925 – 15 September 1984) was Commander-in-Chief Naval Home Command.

Naval career
Clayton joined the Royal Navy in 1942 and served as a midshipman on HMS Cumberland until 1943 when he was on various destroyers of the Home Fleet. He also served on HMS Striker during the Suez Crisis in 1956.

He became Commanding Officer of HMS Puma in 1958 and Executive Officer on HMS Lion in 1962. He became Captain of the Gibraltar Dockyard in 1967 and then commanded HMS Kent and then HMS Hampshire in the late 1960s. He was appointed Flag Officer Second Flotilla in 1973 and Senior Naval Member on Directing Staff at the Royal College of Defence Studies in 1975.

He was appointed Controller of the Navy in 1975 and became Commander-in-Chief Naval Home Command in 1979: he retired in 1981.

In retirement he became a Director at GEC and was a Governor of Rendcomb College. He died in a motor cycling accident in September 1984.

References

|-

1925 births
1984 deaths
Royal Navy admirals
Knights Grand Cross of the Order of the Bath
Royal Navy officers of World War II
British military personnel of the Suez Crisis